The Tianhuangping Pumped Storage Power Station is a pumped-storage power station in Tianhuangping, Anji County of Huzhou, Zhejiang Province, China. The power station has an installed capacity of  utilizing 6 reversible Francis turbines. Construction began in 1993 and the power station was completed in 2004.

Operation

Tianhuangping Dam
Situated on the Daxi Creek, the Tianhuangping Dam creates the power station's lower reservoir.

Upper reservoir
The upper reservoir is artificial and cut into the mountain and created with the assistance of four saddle dams. Before reaching the reversible turbines, the water branches off into six branch pipes.

Power station
The six branch pipes feed water into the six turbines. Each reversible Francis turbine has a  installed capacity and  maximum capacity. After power is produced, the water is discharged back into the lower reservoir and the entire process can repeat.

See also

List of power stations in China
List of Dam in China

References

Dams completed in 2004
Energy infrastructure completed in 2004
Pumped-storage hydroelectric power stations in China
Hydroelectric power stations in Zhejiang
Dams in China
Concrete-face rock-fill dams
Underground power stations